Robert Peel Inlet  is a body of water in Nunavut's Qikiqtaaluk Region. It lies in western Cumberland Sound, forming a wedge into Baffin Island's Hall Peninsula. There are many irregularly shaped islands at the mouth of the inlet.

References

Inlets of Baffin Island